Louis-Julien Petit (born 6 September 1983) is a French writer and director.

Filmography

External links 
 Louis-Julien Petit on AlloCiné
 

French film directors
1983 births
Living people